The Guinean ambassador in Beijing is the official representative of the Government in Conakry to the Government of the People's Republic of China.

List of representatives

References 

Ambassadors of Guinea to China
China
Guinea